Larissa Neapolis Indoor Arena is an indoor sporting arena that is located in the city of Larissa, Greece, in the district of Neapolis. The arena is used to host basketball and volleyball games. The arena is a part of the Larissa National Sports Center complex. 

The permanent seating capacity of the arena for basketball games is 4,000, using only the permanent upper-tier seats, and 5,500 using the retractable lower-tier bleachers. The seating capacity of the arena for volleyball games is 4,000, using only the permanent upper-tier seats, and 6,500 using the retractable lower-tier bleachers.

History
The arena was opened in 1995. Over the years, it has been used at various times, as the home arena of the local basketball teams Gymnastikos S. Larissas, AEL 1964, G.S. Olympia Larissa and Larissa, which all competed in the top-tier level Greek Basket League. It has also been used as the home arena of the women's volleyball team Filathlitikos Larissaikos.

The arena was renovated in 2017.

Events hosted
FIBA Under-19 World Cup Group Stage: (1995)
EuroLeague Women Final Four: (1997)
Greek Cup Final Four: (2003)

See also
List of indoor arenas in Greece

References

External links
Information on the arena @ Stadia.gr
Exterior Image of Larissa Neapolis Indoor Arena
Interior Image 1 of Larissa Neapolis Indoor Arena
Interior Image 2 of Larissa Neapolis Indoor Arena

Basketball venues in Greece
Buildings and structures in Larissa (regional unit)
Handball venues in Greece
Indoor arenas in Greece
Larisa B.C.
Sport in Larissa
Volleyball venues in Greece